Azer Mammadov (born 7 February 1976 in Kirovabad) is an Azerbaijani footballer (defender) who retired in 2013, his last club was FC Kapaz. He is also a former member of the Azerbaijan national football team who made 12 appearances from 2001 to 2006.

Career
In August 2009 Mammadov moved from Qarabağ to Gabala.

Career statistics

National team statistics

References

External links
 

1976 births
Living people
Azerbaijani footballers
Azerbaijan international footballers
Association football defenders
Sportspeople from Ganja, Azerbaijan
Qarabağ FK players
Turan-Tovuz IK players
Gabala FC players
MOIK Baku players